The Canton of Divion was one of the 14 cantons of the arrondissement of Béthune in the Pas-de-Calais department in northern France. It had 18,117 inhabitants in 2012. It was disbanded following the French canton reorganisation which came into effect in March 2015.

References

Divion
2015 disestablishments in France
States and territories disestablished in 2015